Saar status referendum may refer to

 the 1935 Saar status referendum, 
or to
 the 1955 Saar Statute referendum